Spercheiada is a town and a former municipality in the western part of Phthiotis, Greece. Since the 2011 local government reform it is part of the municipality Makrakomi, of which it is the seat and a municipal unit. The municipal unit has an area of 379.521 km2. The population of Spercheiada municipal unit was 7,680, with 2,691 of them from the town of Spercheiada (2011 census).

Subdivisions
The municipal unit Spercheiada is subdivided into the following communities:
Agios Sostis
Anatoli
Argyria
Gardiki
Kallithea
Kampia
Kanalia
Kloni
Kolokythia
Kyriakochori
Lefkada
Marmara
Mesopotamia
Nikolitsi
Palaiovracha
Palaiochori
Perivoli
Pitsi
Platanos
Pougkakia
Spercheiada
Fteri

Notable people 
Elpida (1950-), singer

References

External links
 Prefecture of Fthiotida, Municipality of Sperchiada
 Spercheiada Municipality web site (in Greek)

Populated places in Phthiotis
Spercheios Valley